Mary Mitchell may refer to:

Mary Mitchell Holloway Wilhite (1831–1892), American physician, first female medical graduate from Indiana
Mary Mitchell Birchall (1840–1898), American first female recipient of bachelor's degree in New England
Mary Mitchell Slessor (1848–1915), Scottish Presbyterian missionary to Nigeria
Mary Mitchell (athlete) (1912–2007), New Zealand track and field champion
Mary Mitchell (landscape architect) (1923–1988), English co-author of 1988's The Pattern of Landscape
Mary Mitchell O'Connor (born 1959), Irish Fine Gael politician and cabinet minister
Mary Mitchell, American columnist for Chicago Sun-Times, writing since 1990s
Mary Jo Mitchell, American sports journalist since 2000s, a/k/a Mary Jo Perino and Mary Jo Ford

Other
Mary B Mitchell (schooner), British and Irish schooner, launched 1892 
Mary B Mitchell (Q-ship), First World War service of above schooner

See also
Marion Mitchell (disambiguation)